Penicillium oblatum is an anamorph species of fungus in the genus Penicillium.

Further reading 
 
 
 Rijksherbarium (Netherlands), Persoonia, Band 14. edition 2, publisher, Rijksherbarium (1989)

References 

oblatum
Fungi described in 1985
Medicinal fungi